Worfield is a civil parish in Shropshire, England.  It contains 77 listed buildings that are recorded in the National Heritage List for England.  Of these, one is listed at Grade I, the highest of the three grades, four are at Grade II*, the middle grade, and the others are at Grade II, the lowest grade.  The parish includes the village of Worfield, and other villages and smaller settlements, including Allscot, Ackleton, Chesterton, Hilton, Roughton, Stableford, Swancote, and Wyken, and is otherwise rural.  Most of the listed buildings are houses, cottages, farmhouses and farm buildings, the earlier of which are timber framed, or have timber framed cores.  The other listed buildings include a church, the churchyard wall and gate piers, a country house and associated dovecote, two bridges, a watermill, public houses, a school, a war memorial, and two telephone kiosks.


Key

Buildings

References

Citations

Sources

Lists of buildings and structures in Shropshire